T. S. Sivagnanam (born 16 September 1963) is an Indian Judge. Presently, he is a Judge of Calcutta High Court. He is former Judge of Madras High Court.

Early life 
Dr. T. S. Subbiah and Mrs. Nalini Subbiah are the parents of  Justice T. S. Sivagnanam. He was born on 16 September 1963. Justice Sivagnanam had completed his B.Sc. degree graduation at Loyola College, Chennai and he obtained his B.L. degree from Madras Law College and enrolled in the Bar Council of Tamil Nadu on 10 September 1986.

As an advocate 
After enrollment, Justice Sivagnanam joined the chamber of Shri. R. Gandhi, Senior Advocate. Justice Sivagnanam was appointed Additional Central Government Standing Counsel during 2000.

As judge of high court 
Justice Sivagnanam was appointed Additional Judge, of the High Court of Madras on 31 March 2009 and later he was appointed  Permanent Judge on 29 March 2011. He is the Chairman for the Computer Committee of the High Court of Madras. He was transferred as a Judge of Calcutta High Court and took oath on 25 October 2021.

TNSJA 
Justice T. S. Sivagnanam is one of the Members of the Board of Governors of the T. N. S. J. A (Tamil Nadu State Judicial Academy).

Virtual hearings 
During the COVID - 19 pandemic, the Computer Committee of the High Court of Madras, headed by Justice T.S. Sivagnanam had decided to purchase 100 Licences of "MicrosoftTeam" for conducting  Virtual Hearing of the Cases by all Judicial Officers in the State of Tamil Nadu.

Electronic processes 
Another important step taken by the Computer Committee of the High Court of Madras, headed by Justice T. S. Sivagnanam, was to introduce NSTEP (National Service and Tracking of Electronic Process). By purchasing 1200 Smart Phones for the Process Servers, the Service of the Court Processes was made easy, simple within a short span of time.

Important Cases

Mines case 
In an Important case, Justices T S Sivagnanam and G Jayachandran passed an order of winding up the commission headed by IAS officer U Sagayam. This case was relating to the appointment of former Madurai District Collector Sagayam as Special Officer/Legal Commissioner to conduct probe into all granite mining contracts and licences given to various private companies in Tamil Nadu.

Sterlite Plant Case

Justices T S Sivagnanam and V Bhavani Subbaroyan in a judgement dismissed a batch of 10 petitions filed by Vedanta on behalf of the Sterlite Copper Plant at Thoothukudi.

Income Tax Notice case

Justice T S Sivagnanam had allowed writ petitions filed by the former Finance Minister of India Mr. Chidambaram and his family members, challenging the demand notices saying there was reason to believe that income chargeable to tax had escaped assessment. Mr. Chidambaram submitted that he and his family grow coffee and after pulping and drying, sell the raw coffee. Proceeds of its sale are agricultural income exempted from the applicability of Section 10(1) of the Income Tax Act.

References 

1963 births
Living people
Judges of the Madras High Court
Indian judges
Judges of the Calcutta High Court
Loyola College, Chennai alumni